The Bombyliidae are a family of flies, commonly known as bee flies. Adults generally feed on nectar and pollen, some being important pollinators. Larvae are mostly parasitoids of other insects.

Overview 
The Bombyliidae are a large family of flies comprising hundreds of genera, but the life cycles of most species are known poorly, or not at all. They range in size from very small (2 mm in length) to very large for flies (wingspan of some 40 mm). When at rest, many species hold their wings at a characteristic "swept back" angle.  Adults generally feed on nectar and pollen, some being important pollinators, often with spectacularly long proboscises adapted to plants such as Lapeirousia species with very long, narrow floral tubes. Unlike butterflies, bee flies hold their proboscis straight, and cannot retract it. In parts of East Anglia, locals refer to them as beewhals, thanks to their tusk-like appendages. Many Bombyliidae superficially resemble bees and accordingly the prevalent common name for a member of the family is bee fly. Possibly the resemblance is Batesian mimicry, affording the adults some protection from predators.

The larval stages are predators or parasitoids of the eggs and larvae of other insects. The adult females usually deposit eggs in the vicinity of possible hosts, quite often in the burrows of beetles or wasps/solitary bees. Although insect parasitoids usually are fairly host-specific, often highly host-specific, some Bombyliidae are opportunistic and will attack a variety of hosts.

The Bombyliidae include at least 4,500 described species, and certainly thousands more remain to be described. However, most species do not often appear in abundance, and compared to other major groups of pollinators they are much less likely to visit flowering plants in urban parks or suburban gardens. As a result, this is arguably one of the most poorly known families of insects relative to its species richness. The family has a patchy fossil record, with species being known from a handful of localities, the oldest known species are known from the Middle Cretaceous Burmese amber, around 99 million years old.

Morphology

Adult

Although the morphology of beeflies varies in detail, adults of most bee flies are characterized by some morphological details that make recognition easy. The dimensions of the body vary, depending on the species, from 1.0 mm to 2.5 cm. The form is often compact and the integument is usually covered with dense and abundant hair. The coloration is usually inconspicuous and colours such as brown, blackish- grey, and light colors like white or yellow predominate. Many species are mimics of Hymenoptera Apoidea. In other species patches of flattened hairs occur that can act as silvery, gilded or coppertone reflecting mirrors; these perhaps serve as visual signals in conspecific mate/rival recognition, or perhaps imitate reflecting surface particles on bare soils with high content of materials like quartz, mica or pyrite.

The head is round, with a convex face, often holoptic in males. The antennae are of the type aristate composed of three to six segments, with the third segment larger than the others; the stylus is absent (antenna of three segments) or is composed of one to three flagellomeres (antenna of four to six segments). The mouthparts are modified for sucking and adapted for feeding on flowers. The length varies considerably: for example, the Anthracinae have short mouthparts, with the labium terminating in a large fleshy labellum, in Bombyliinae; in Phthiriinae, the tube is considerably longer, and in Bombyliinae more than four times the length of the head.

The legs are long and thin and the front legs are sometimes smaller and more slender than the middle and rear legs. Typically, they are provided with bristles at the apex of the tibiae, without empodia and, sometimes, also without pulvilli. The wings are transparent, often hyaline or evenly colored or with bands. The alula are well developed and in the rest position the wings are kept open and horizontal in a V shape revealing the sides of the abdomen.

The abdomen is generally short and wide, subglobose-shaped, cylindrical, or conical, composed of six to eight apparent urites. The remaining urites are part of the structure of the external genitalia. The abdomen of the females often ends with spinous processes, used in ovideposition. In Anthracinae and  Bombyliinae, a diverticulum is present in the eighth urite, in which the eggs are mixed with sand before being deposited.

The wing venation, although variable within the family, has some common characteristics that can be summarized basically in the particular morphology of the branches of the radial sector and the reduction of the forking of the media. The costa is spread over the entire margin and the subcosta is long, often ending on the distal half of the costal margin. The radius is almost always divided into four branches, with fusion of the branches R 2 and R 3, and is characterized by the sinuosity of the end portions of the branches of the radial sector. The venation presents a marked simplification compared to other Asiloidea and, in general, to other lower Brachycera. M 1 is always present and converges on the margin or, sometimes, of R 5. M 2 is present and reaches the margin, or is absent. M 3 is always absent and merged with M 4. The discal cell is usually present. The branch M 3 +4 is separated from the discal cell at the distal posterior vertex, so the mid-cubital connects directly to the posterior margin of the discal cell. The cubital and anal veins are complete and end separately on the margin or converge joining for a short distance Consequently, the cell cup may be open or closed.

Hoverflies of the family Syrphidae often mimic Hymenoptera as well, and some syrphid species are hard to tell apart from Bombyliidae at first glance, especially for bee fly species that lack a long proboscis or long, thin legs. Such bombyliids can still be distinguished in the field by anatomical features such as:

- They usually have an evenly curved or sloping face (hoverflies often have prominent bulges of the facial cuticle and/or beak- to knob-like facial projections).

- The wings lack a "false rear edge" and often have large dark areas with sharp boundaries, or complex patterns of spots (hoverfly wings are often clear or have smooth gradients of tinting, and their veins merge posteriorly into a "false edge" rather than reaching the wing's true rear edge).

- The abdomen and thorax hardly ever have large glossy areas formed by exposed cuticle (hoverflies often have glossy cuticular body surfaces).

Larva
The larvae of most bee flies are of two types. Those of the first type are elongated and cylindrical in shape and have a metapneustic or amphipneustic tracheal system, provided with a pair of abdominal spiracles and, possibly, a thoracic pair. Those of the second type are stubby and eucephalic and have one pair of spiracles positioned in the abdomen.(ref needed)

Biology

Adults favour sunny conditions and dry, often sandy or rocky areas. They have powerful wings and are found typically in flight over flowers or resting on the bare ground exposed to the sun (watch video) They significantly contribute to cross pollination of plants, becoming the main pollinators of some plant species of desert environments. Unlike the majority of glyciphagous dipterans, the bee flies feed on pollen (from which they meet their protein requirements). A similar trophic behavior occurs among the hoverflies, another important family of Diptera pollinators.

As with hoverflies, bee flies are capable of sudden acceleration or deceleration, all but momentum-free high-speed changes of direction, superb control of position while hovering in mid-air, as well as a characteristically cautious approach of a possible feeding or landing site.
Bombyliids are often recognizable by their stocky shapes, by their hovering behavior, and for the particular length of their mouthparts and/or legs as they lean forward into flowers. Unlike hoverflies, which settle on the flower as do bees and other pollinating insects, those bee fly species which have a long proboscis generally feed while continuing to hover in the air, rather like Sphingidae, or while touching the flower with their front legs to stabilize their position - without fully landing or ceasing oscillation of the wings.

Species with shorter proboscis do land and walk on flower heads, however, and can be much harder to distinguish from hoverflies in the field. As noted, many bee fly species spend regular time intervals at rest on or near the ground, while hoverflies hardly ever do so. It can therefore be informative to watch feeding individuals and see whether or not they move down to ground level after a few minutes. Close observation is often easier with feeding individuals than with flies on the ground, as the latter are especially quick to take flight at the first sight of moving silhouettes or approaching shadows.

Mating behavior has only been observed in a handful of species. It can vary from fairly generic swarming or unsolicited mid-air interception, as is common in many Diptera, to courtship behavior involving a context-specific flight pattern and wingbeat pitch of the male, with or without repeated proboscis contact between male and female. Males often seek out smaller or larger clearings on the ground, presumably in vicinity of flowering plants or host nesting habitats that are likely attractive to females. They can return to their chosen perch or patch after every feeding bout or after pursuit of other insects flying over, or they can instead survey their chosen territory while hovering one or more meters above the bare patch.

Gravid females seek out nesting habitats of hosts, and can spend many minutes inspecting for example entrances of smaller burrows in soil. In some species this behavior consists of hovering and repeated split-second foreleg touches of soil near the edge of the burrow's entrance, presumably to detect biochemical clues about the burrow's constructor such as identity, recency of visiting etc. If a burrow passes scrutiny then the bee fly may proceed to land and insert its posterior abdomen into the soil, laying one or more eggs at the edge or in close vicinity to it. In nine subfamilies including the more frequently observable Bombyliinae and Anthracinae, the females often do not land at all during host burrow inspections, and will proceed to release their eggs from midair by quick flicks of the abdomen while hovering over the burrow's entrance.

This remarkable behavior has earned such species the colloquial name of Bomber flies, it can be seen in Roy Kleuker's online video clip in YouTube. Female flies with this remarkable oviposition strategy typically have a ventral storage structure known as a sand chamber on the posterior end of the abdomen, which is filled with sand grains gathered before egg laying. These sand grains are used to coat each egg just before their aerial release, which is assumed to improve the female's aim as well as the egg's survival chances by adding weight, slowing down egg dehydration, masking biochemical cues that could trigger host behavior such as nest cleaning or abandonment - or a combination of all three.

Despite the high number of species of this family, the biology of juveniles of most species is poorly understood. The postembryonic development is of the type hypermetamorphic, with parasitoid or hyperparasitoid larvae. Exceptions are the larvae of Heterotropinae, whose biology is similar to that of other Asiloidea, with predatory larvae that do not undergo hypermetamorphosis. Hosts of bee flies belong to different orders of insects, but mostly are among the holometabolous orders. Among these are Hymenoptera, in particular the superfamilies of Vespoidea and Apoidea, beetles, other flies, and moths. Larvae of some species including Villa sp. feed on ova of Orthoptera. Bombylius major larvae are parasitic on solitary bees including Andrena. Anthrax anale is a parasite of tiger beetle larvae, and A. trifasciata is a parasite of the wall bee. Several African species of Villa and Thyridanthrax are parasitic pupae of tsetse flies. Villa morio is parasitic on the beneficial ichneumonid species Banchus femoralis. The larvae of Dipalta are parasitic on antlions.

The behavior of known forms is similar to that of the larvae of Nemestrinoidea: the first instar larva of is a planidium while the other stages have a parasitic habitus. The eggs are laid usually in a future host or at the nest where the host develops. The planidium enters the nest and undergoes changes before starting to feed.

Zoogeography
The family is worldwide (Palearctic realm,  Nearctic realm,  Afrotropical realm, Neotropical realm,  Australasian realm, Oceanian realm, Indomalayan realm), but has the greatest biodiversity in tropical and subtropical arid climates. In Europe,  335 species are distributed among 53 genera.

Species lists

West Palaearctic including Russia
Australasian/Oceanian
Nearctic
Japan
World list

Systematics

The systematics of bee flies are the most uncertain of any family of lower Brachycera. Willi Hennig (1973) placed the bee flies in the superfamily of Nemestrinoidea, on the basis of analogies in the behaviour of the larvae, positioning the superfamily in Tabanomorpha inside the infraorder Homoeodactyla
Boris Rohdendorf (1974) dealt with the family in a separate superfamily (Bombyliidea), linking it to the superfamily of Asilidea. Currently the close correlation either positions the bee-flies within the superfamily Asiloidea sensu Rohdendorf (Asilidea) or they are included with the families separated by Rohdendorf in the superfamily of Asiloidea.

The internal systematic of bee-flies is uncertain. In the past, 31 subfamilies were well defined, but the family is thought to be polyphyletic (sensu lato). In the 1980s and '90s, the family has undergone several revisions: Webb (1981)  finally moved the genus Hilarimorpha into their own family (Hilarimorphidae). Zaitzev (1991)  moved the genus Mythicomyia and several other minor genera in the family Mythicomyiidae, Yeates (1992, 1994)  shifted the entire subfamily of Proratinae, with the exception of Apystomyia, into the family of  Scenopinidae and subsequently the genus Apystomyia into the family Hilarimorphidae. Nagatomi & Liu (1994) moved Apystomyia into a family of their own (Apystomyiidae. After these revisions, the bee flies sensu stricto have a greater morphological homogeneity, but the monophyly of the family still remains dubious. Phylogenetic analysis of CAD and 28S rDNA gene sequences supports monophyly of only eight subfamilies out of fifteen included in the study, with the Bombyliinae resolving as a highly polyphyletic group.

Overall, the family includes about 4700 described species, distributed among 270 genera. The internal arrangement varies according to the source, according to the different frameworks the authors attribute to tribes and subfamilies. To divide the family, often this scheme is used:

Genera

Acanthogeron Bezzi, 1925
Acreophthiria Evenhuis, 1986
Acreotrichus Macquart, 1840
Acrophthalmyda Bigot, 1858
Adelidea Macquart, 1840
Adelogenys Hesse, 1938
Aldrichia Coquillett, 1894
Alepidophora Cockerell, 1909
Aleucosia Edwards, 1934
Alomatia Cockerell, 1914
Amictites Hennig, 1966
Amictus Wiedemann, 1817
Amphicosmus Coquillett, 1891
Anastoechus Osten Sacken, 1877
Anisotamia Macquart, 1840
Anthrax Scopoli, 1763
Antonia Loew, 1856
Antoniaustralia Becker, 1913
Apatomyza Wiedemann, 1820
Aphoebantus Loew, 1872
Apolysis Loew, 1860
Astrophanes Osten Sacken, 1877
Atrichochira Hesse, 1956
Australiphthiria Evenhuis, 1986
Australoechus Greathead, 1995
Balaana Lambkin & Yeates, 2003
Beckerellus Greathead, 1995
Bombomyia Greathead, 1995
Bombylella Greathead, 1995
Bombylisoma Rondani, 1856
Bombylius Linnaeus, 1758, 1758
Brachyanax Evenhuis, 1981
Brachydemia Hull, 1973
Bromoglycis Hull, 1971
Brychosoma Hull, 1973
Bryodemina Hull, 1973
Cacoplox Hull, 1970
Caecanthrax Greathead, 1981
Callostoma Macquart, 1840
Callynthrophora Schiner, 1868
Canariellum Strand, 1928
Chalcochiton Loew, 1844
Choristus Walker, 1852
Chrysanthrax Osten Sacken, 1886
Colossoptera Hull, 1973
Comptosia Macquart, 1840
Conomyza Hesse, 1956
Cononedys Hermann, 1907
Conophorina Becker, 1920
Conophorus Meigen, 1803
Corsomyza Wiedemann, 1820
Coryprosopa Hesse, 1956
Crocidium Loew, 1860
Cryomyia Hull, 1973
Cyananthrax Painter, 1959
Cyllenia Latreille, 1802
Cyrtomyia Bigot, 1892
Cytherea Fabricius, 1794
Cyx Evenhuis, 1993
Dasypalpus Macquart, 1840
Desmatomyia Williston, 1895
Desmatoneura Williston, 1895
Deusopora Hull, 1971
Diatropomma Bowden, 1962
Dicranoclista Bezzi, 1924
Diochanthrax Hall, 1975
Dipalta Osten Sacken, 1877
Diplocampta Schiner, 1868
Dischistus Loew, 1855
Docidomyia White, 1916
Doddosia Edwards, 1934
Dolichomyia Wiedemann, 1830
Doliogethys Hesse, 1938
Eclimus Loew, 1844
Edmundiella Becker, 1915
Efflatounia Bezzi, 1925
Enica Macquart, 1834
Epacmoides Hesse, 1956
Epacmus Osten Sacken, 1886
Eremyia Greathead, 1996\
Eristalopsis Evenhuis, 1985
Eucessia Coquillett, 1886
Euchariomyia Bigot, 1888
Euprepina Hull, 1971
Eurycarenus Loew, 1860
Euryphthiria Evenhuis, 1986
Eusurbus Roberts, 1929
Exechohypopion Evenhuis, 1991
Exepacmus Coquillett, 1894
Exhyalanthrax Becker, 1916
Exoprosopa Macquart, 1840
Geminaria Coquillett, 1894
Geron Meigen, 1820
Glaesamictus Hennig, 1966
Gnumyia Bezzi, 1921
Gonarthrus Bezzi, 1921
Gyrocraspedum Becker, 1913
Hallidia Hull, 1970
Hemipenthes Loew, 1869
Heteralonia Rondani, 1863
Heterostylum Macquart, 1848
Heterotropus Loew, 1873
Hyperalonia Rondani, 1863
Hyperusia Bezzi, 1921
Inyo Hall & Evenhuis, 1987
Isocnemus Bezzi, 1924
Kapu Lambkin & Yeates, 2003
Karakumia Paramonov, 1927
Laminanthrax Greathead, 1967
Larrpana Lambkin & Yeates, 2003
Laurella Hull, 1971
Legnotomyia Bezzi, 1902
Lepidanthrax Osten Sacken, 1886
Lepidochlanus Hesse, 1938
Lepidophora Westwood, 1835
Ligyra Newman, 1841
Litorhina Bowden, 1975
Lomatia Meigen, 1822
Lordotus Loew, 1863
Macrocondyla Rondani, 1863
Mallophthiria Edwards, 1930
Mancia Coquillett, 1886
Mandella Evenhuis, 1983
Mariobezzia Becker, 1913
Marleyimyia Hesse, 1956
Marmosoma White, 1916
Megapalpus Macquart, 1834
Megaphthiria Hall, 1976
Melanderella Cockerell, 1909
Meomyia Evenhuis, 1983
Metacosmus Coquillett, 1891
Micomitra Bowden, 1964
Munjua Lambkin & Yeates, 2003
Muscatheres Evenhuis, 1986
Muwarna Lambkin & Yeates, 2003
Myonema Roberts, 1929
Neacreotrichus Cockerell, 1917
Nectaropota Philippi, 1865
Neobombylodes Evenhuis, 1978
Neodiplocampta Curran, 1934
Neodischistus Painter, 1933
Neosardus Roberts, 1929
Nomalonia Rondani, 1863
Nothoschistus Bowden, 1985
Notolomatia Greathead, 1998
Oestranthrax Bezzi, 1921
Oestrimyza Hull, 1973
Ogcodocera Macquart, 1840
Oligodranes Loew, 1844
Oncodosia Edwards, 1937
Oniromyia Bezzi, 1921
Othniomyia Hesse, 1938
Pachyanthrax François, 1964
Pachysystropus Cockerell, 1909
Palaeoamictus Meunier, 1916
Palaeogeron Meunier, 1915
Palintonus François, 1964
Palirika Lambkin & Yeates, 2003
Pantarbes Osten Sacken, 1877
Pantostomus Bezzi, 1921
Paracorsomyza Hennig, 1966
Paradiplocampta Hall, 1975
Parachistus Greathead, 1980
Paracosmus Osten Sacken, 1877
Parageron Paramonov, 1929
Paramonovius Li & Yeates, 2018
Paranthrax Bigot, 1876
Parasysteochus Hall, 1976
Paratoxophora Engel, 1936
Paravilla Painter, 1933
Parisus Walker, 1852
Perengueyimyia Bigot, 1886
Petrorossia Bezzi, 1908
Phthiria Meigen, 1803
Pilosia Hull, 1973
Pipunculopsis Bezzi, 1925
Platamomyia Brèthes, 1925
Plesiocera Macquart, 1840
Poecilanthrax Osten Sacken, 1886
Poecilognathus Jaennicke, 1867
Praecytherea Théobald, 1937
Prorachthes Loew, 1868
Prorostoma Hesse, 1956
Prothaplocnemis Bezzi, 1925
Pseudopenthes Roberts, 1928
Pteraulacodes Hesse, 1956
Pteraulax Bezzi, 1921
Pterobates Bezzi, 1921
Pusilla Paramonov, 1954
Pygocona Hull, 1973
Relictiphthiria Evenhuis, 1986
Rhynchanthrax Painter, 1933
Satyramoeba Sack, 1909
Semiramis Becker, 1913
Semistoechus Hall, 1976
Sericosoma Macquart, 1850
Sericothrix Hall, 1976
Sericusia Edwards, 1937
Sinaia Becker, 1916
Sisyromyia White, 1916
Sisyrophanus Karsch, 1886
Sosiomyia Bezzi, 1921
Sparnopolius Loew, 1855
Sphenoidoptera Williston, 1901
Spogostylum Macquart, 1840
Staurostichus Hull, 1973
Stomylomyia Bigot, 1888
Stonyx Osten Sacken, 1886
Synthesia Bezzi, 1921
Systoechus Loew, 1855
Systropus Wiedemann, 1820
Thevenetimyia Bigot, 1875
Thraxan Yeates & Lambkin, 1998
Thyridanthrax Osten Sacken, 1886
Tillyardomyia Tonnoir, 1927
Timiomyia Evenhuis, 1978
Tithonomyia Evenhuis, 1984
Tmemophlebia Evenhuis, 1986
Tomomyza Wiedemann, 1820
Tovlinius Zaitzev, 1979
Toxophora Meigen, 1803
Triplasius Loew, 1855
Triploechus Edwards, 1937
Turkmeniella Paramonov, 1940
Usia Latreille, 1802
Veribubo Evenhuis, 1978
Verrallites Cockerell, 1913
Villa Lioy, 1864
Villoestrus Paramonov, 1931
Walkeromyia Paramonov, 1934
Wurda Lambkin & Yeates, 2003
Xenoprosopa Hesse, 1956
Xenox Evenhuis, 1984
Xerachistus Greathead, 1995
Xeramoeba Hesse, 1956
Ylasoia Speiser, 1920
Zaclava Hull, 1973
Zinnomyia Hesse, 1955
Zyxmyia Bowden, 1960

Gallery

References 

Bowden, J.,1980 Family Bombyliidae. pp. 381–430. In R.W. Crosskey (ed.), Catalogue of the Diptera of the Afrotropical Region, 1437 pp., London: British Museum (Natural History)
Engel, E.O., 1932-1937. Bombyliidae. In: Die Fliegen der paläarktischen Region 4(3) ( Erwin Lindner, ed.): 1-619, pl. 1-15. E. Schweizerbart, Stuttgart.). Old and outdated, not easy to get and expensive but some of the only keys to taxa in the Palaearctic Region.
Greathead & Evenhuis (Greathead, D.J., & N.L. Evenhuis, 1997. Family Bombyliidae. In: Contributions to a manual of Palaearctic Diptera Volume 2 (L. Papp & B. Darvas, eds.): 487-512. Science Herald, Budapest.) provide a key to the Palaearctic genera and (may) give references to available generic revisions.

Evenhuis, N.L. & Greathead, D.J. 1999. World catalog of bee flies (Diptera: Bombyliidae). Backhuys Publishers, Leiden, 756 pp. online
Hull, F.M. 1973. Bee flies of the world. The genera of the family Bombyliidae.Washington (Smithsonian Institution Press) 687 pp. Keys subfamilies, genera (many generic placements superseded by Evenhuis & Greathead, 1999).
Yeates, David K. 1994. The cladistics and classification of the Bombyliidae (Diptera: Asiloidea). Bulletin of the American Museum of Natural History ; no. 219, 191 pp.

External links 

 Image Gallery from Diptera.info
 Bombyliidae (Bee Flies) by David K. Yeates and Christine L. Lambkin in the Tree of Life web project. Consulted March 28, 2007.
 Wing venation

 
Brachycera families
Insects used as insect pest control agents
Articles containing video clips
Taxa named by Pierre André Latreille